Chalk Marks is a 1924 American silent drama film directed by John G. Adolfi and starring Marguerite Snow and June Elvidge. It was distributed by Producers Distributing Corporation.

Cast

Preservation
With no prints of Chalk Marks located in any film archives, it is a lost film.

References

External links

Lobby card

1924 films
Lost American films
American silent feature films
Films directed by John G. Adolfi
Producers Distributing Corporation films
American black-and-white films
Films with screenplays by Frank E. Woods
American adventure films
1924 adventure films
1924 lost films
Lost adventure films
1920s American films
Silent adventure films